M59-UCD3 is an ultra-compact dwarf galaxy located near the Messier 59 galaxy. , it is the second-densest galaxy currently observed, second to M85-HCC1.

References

See also
 M60-UCD1 (densest galaxy known, as of 2013)
 M85-HCC1 (densest galaxy known, as of 2015)

Virgo (constellation)
Dwarf galaxies
20150727